Nebel is the German word for fog and stellar nebula. It is related to the Latin nebula. It may refer to:

Places
 Nebel, Germany, a municipality on the island of Amrum in Schleswig-Holstein
 The Nebel parish in Horsens Municipality in Denmark
 Nørre Nebel, the capital of Blaabjerg, in Ribe County, Denmark

Other
 Nebel (surname)
 Alois Nebel, Czech comic strip and film
 Nacht und Nebel, the Adolf Hitler edict of 1941
 Nebel or nabla, a Hebrew stringed instrument
 Nebel (river), in Mecklenburg-Vorpommern, Germany
 "Nebel", the last song on the Mutter album by the German band Rammstein
 Nebelwerfer, a World War II rocket artillery piece